The 2003 Formula 3 Euro Series season was the first championship year of Europe's premier Formula Three series. The championship consisted of ten rounds – each with two races – held at a variety of European circuits. Each weekend consisted of 1 hour and 30 minutes of free practice on Friday – in either one or two sessions – and two 30-minute qualifying sessions. This was followed by a c.110 km race on Saturday and a c.80 km race on Sunday. Each qualifying session awarded one bonus point for pole position and each race awarded points for the top eight finishers, with ten points per win. It commenced on April 26, 2003 at Hockenheimring and ended on October 26 at Circuit de Nevers Magny-Cours.

Teams and drivers

Driver changes
 Entering Formula 3 Euro Series
 Simon Abadie: French Formula Three Championship (Saulnier Racing) → Saulnier Racing
 Nicolas Armindo: Championnat de France Formula Renault 2.0 & Eurocup Formula Renault 2.0 (ASM Elf) → Saulnier Racing
 Bernhard Auinger: German Formula Three Championship (Opel Team BSR) → Superfund TME
 Philipp Baron: Debut → Drumel Motorsport
 Ryan Briscoe: German Formula Three Championship (Prema Powerteam) & International Formula 3000 (Coca-Cola Nordic Racing) → Prema Powerteam
 César Campaniço: German Formula Three Championship (Prema Powerteam) → Swiss Racing Team
 Fabio Carbone: British Formula 3 Championship (Fortec Motorsport) → Signature Plus
 Adam Carroll: British Formula 3 National Class (Sweeney Racing) → Opel Team KMS
 Robert Doornbos: German Formula Three Championship (Team Ghinzani) → Team Ghinzani
 Maro Engel: Formula BMW ADAC (Eifelland Racing) → Opel Team KMS
 Timo Glock: German Formula Three Championship (Opel Team KMS) → Opel Team KMS
 Lucas di Grassi: Formula Renault 2.0 Brazil (G Force Motorsport) → Prema Powerteam
 Jamie Green: Formula Renault 2.0 UK (Fortec Motorsport) → ASM
 Jan Heylen: British Formula Ford Championship (Duckhams) → Kolles
 Katsuyuki Hiranaka: All-Japan Formula Three Championship (TOM'S) → Prema Powerteam
 Christian Klien: Formula Renault 2.0 Germany & Eurocup Formula Renault 2.0 (JD Motorsport) → Mücke Motorsport
 Robert Kubica: Formula Renault 2.0 Italy & Eurocup Formula Renault 2.0 (RC Motorsport) → Prema Powerteam
 Nicolas Lapierre: Eurocup Formula Renault 2.0 (Graff Racing)  & French Formula Three Championship (Signature) → Signature Plus
 Marcel Lasée: German Formula Three Championship (Mücke Motorsport) → Swiss Racing Team
 Dong-Wook Lee: Asian Formula Three Championship (E-Rain) → Drumel Motorsport
 Richard Lietz: German Formula Three Championship (Palfinger F3 Racing) → HBR Motorsport
 James Manderson: Australian Formula 3 (Bronte Rundle Motorsport) → Swiss Racing Team
 Patrice Manopoulos: Debut → LD Autosport
 Alexandros Margaritis: Formula Renault 2.0 Germany & Formula BMW ADAC (Weigl Motorsport) → MB Racing Performance
 Álvaro Parente: Spanish Formula Three Championship (Racing Engineering) → Team Ghinzani
 Olivier Pla: French Formula Three Championship (ASM) → ASM
 Alexandre Prémat: Championnat de France Formula Renault 2.0 & Eurocup Formula Renault 2.0 (ASM Elf) → ASM
 Harold Primat: British Formula 3 National Class (Diamond Racing) → Saulnier Racing
 Stefano Proetto: German Formula Three Championship (Team Kolles Racing & Swiss Racing Team) → LD Autosport
 Daniel la Rosa: Formula Volkswagen Germany (???) → MB Racing Performance
 Nico Rosberg: Formula BMW ADAC (VIVA Racing) → Team Rosberg
 Bruno Spengler: Formula Renault 2.0 Germany & Eurocup Formula Renault 2.0 (Jenzer Motorsport) → ASM
 Gilles Tinguely: German Formula Three Championship (Swiss Racing Team) → Swiss Racing Team
 Claudio Torre: Formula BMW ADAC (Springbok Motorsport) → HBR Motorsport
 Hendrik Vieth: Formula Renault 2.0 Germany & Eurocup Formula Renault 2.0 (SL Formula Racing) → Opel Team KMS
 Markus Winkelhock: German Formula Three Championship (Mücke Motorsport) → Mücke Motorsport
 Sakon Yamamoto: German Formula Three Championship (GM Motorsport, Team Kolles Racing) → Superfund TME
 Andreas Zuber: Formula Renault 2.0 Germany (Motopark Oschersleben) → Team Rosberg
 Charles Zwolsman Jr.: German Formula Three Championship (Team Kolles Racing) → Kolles

Midseason changes
 César Campaniço joined Signature Plus for Magny-Cours races
 Simon Abadie joined LD Autosport from Nürburgring races onwards.
 Philipp Baron joined Team Ghinzani from Pau races onwards.
 Stefano Proetto joined Swiss Racing Team from second Hockenheimring races onwards.

Calendar
 The series supported the Deutsche Tourenwagen Masters at seven rounds. It was also a part of the Grand Prix Aurore at two French meetings, while at the third, it was the headline event of the Pau Grand Prix.

Results

Season standings

Drivers Standings
Points are awarded as follows:

† — Drivers did not finish the race, but were classified as they completed over 90% of the race distance.

Rookie Cup
Rookie drivers are only eligible for the Rookie Cup title if they have not previously competed in a national or international Formula 3 championship.

Nations Cup

Notes

References

External links
Forix.autosport.com
Speedsport Magazine
Formel3guide.com (German language)
F1Prospects.com

Formula 3 Euro Series seasons
Formula 3 Euro Series
Euro Series
Formula 3 Euro Series